Jordan is a station on the Hong Kong MTR . It has dark green and light green livery. It is named after Jordan Road.

Location

Jordan station is located in Jordan at the intersection of two main thoroughfares: Nathan Road and Jordan Road, the station eponymously named after the latter. The northern portion of Kowloon Park is only a few blocks south of the station and King's Park is about 250m northeast using Jordan Road. A number of important hotels, buildings, and shopping centres are within walking distance of the station. These include the Novotel Nathan Road Kowloon Hong Kong, Baden-Powell International House, Eaton Hotel Hong Kong, and the Antiquities and Monuments Office.

History
In 2000, along with five other stations on the Tsuen Wan line, Jordan became one of the first stations in the MTR network to be retrofitted with platform screen doors which aid in ventilation, crowd control and passenger safety.

Station layout
Jordan is laid out similarly to many MTR stations. Passengers enter on the ground level and take escalators down to the concourse, and then one more level down to the centre island with two platforms.

Entrances/exits
 A: Yue Hwa Chinese Products
 B: Queen Elizabeth Hospital
 B1: Novotel Nathan Road Kowloon Hong Kong / Chung Hing Hotel / Eaton Hotel 
 B2: Diocesan Girls' School / Queen Elizabeth Hospital 
 C: Bowring Street
 C1: Austin Road
 C2: Bowring Street, Kwun Chung Municipal Services Building
 D: Austin Road
 E: Prudential Centre / Pruton Prudential Hotel

See also
 Jordan, Hong Kong

References

MTR stations in Kowloon
Tsuen Wan line
Kwun Chung
Railway stations in Hong Kong opened in 1979